Daughters of Zion Cemetery, also known as Zion Cemetery, Society Cemetery, and Old Oakwood Section, is a historic African-American cemetery located at Charlottesville, Virginia, United States.  It was established in 1873, and contains an estimated 300 burial sites with 152 of the burials commemorated with 136 surviving grave markers. It consists exclusively of marble and granite grave markers with a single 20 foot by 20 foot section enclosed with a cast-iron fence. Notable burials include Benjamin Tonsler (1854–1917), who built the Benjamin Tonsler House. The city assumed title to the property in the 1970s, and the last burial occurred in 1995.

It was listed on the National Register of Historic Places in 2010.

References

External links
 Information on the Jefferson School from Virginia African Heritage Program
 

African-American history of Virginia
Cemeteries on the National Register of Historic Places in Virginia
1873 establishments in Virginia
National Register of Historic Places in Charlottesville, Virginia
African-American cemeteries